Yeading is a settlement in west London, forming part of the London Borough of Hillingdon, having been developed after the Second World War.

Etymology
Yeading is very early Saxon and was originally Geddingas or Geddinges, meaning "the people of Geddi".

History
The earliest surviving documented allusion to Yeading dates from 757 AD, in which year Æthelbald of Mercia made a land grant which mentioned Geddinges (Yeading) and Fiscesburne (Crane or Yeading Brook). The first land grant including Yeading was made by Offa in 790 to Æthelhard, Archbishop of Canterbury: "in the place called on linga Haese [Hayes] and Geddinges [Yeading] around the stream called Fiscesburna [Crane or Yeading Brook]."

Anglo-Saxon settlement in Yeading therefore seems probable, but the history of Yeading in subsequent centuries is not as clear as that of Hayes. Such details as the names of many Yeading manor holders remain unknown.

Yeading Dock was one of many docks built along the Grand Union Canal in the 19th and early 20th centuries. The main industry in Hayes and Yeading at this time was brickmaking, and the canal provided a reliable way of transporting larger numbers of bricks. Yeading's brickworkers could be known to keep pigs as a second source of income. A bourgeois writer, one Elizabeth Hunt, wrote in 1861 that in "Yeading dirt, ignorance and darkness reign supreme." In 1874, however, one James Thorne wrote that the inhabitants of Yeading were "always found civil".

Yeading was still not developed in the 1920s. Yeading Lane was often flooded, and access beyond Yeading to Northolt seems to have been by footpath only before the First World War. During the War, a properly constructed road was built linking the Great Western Railway station at Hayes with the L.N.E.R. line at  Northolt. Yeading was still mainly a rural area.

After the Second World War, a large prefab estate was erected in Yeading. By 1956, Yeading's Tilbury Square was still without gas and electricity, and oil stoves and open fires were still used; the public house The Willow Tree, reputedly some 400 years old (demolished in 2009), was lit by three cylinders of calor gas. The Yeading Lane estate underwent largescale development in the late 1960s and '70s.

Education
Schools in Yeading include:
 Barnhill Community High School
 Yeading Infant and Nursery School
 Yeading Junior School
Brookside Primary School
Belmore Primary School

Demographics
The largest ethnic group in the Hillingdon ward of Yeading in the 2011 Census was White British with 28.3%. This was followed by Indians (20.3%), Other Asians (11.5%) and Black Africans (8.1%).

56.3% of people living in Yeading were born in England according to the 2011 census. Other popular places of birth included India (10.6%), Sri Lanka (3.2%), Pakistan (2.8%) and Somalia (2.6%).

The most popular religious affiliation in Yeading is Christianity at 37.1%. Other common religious include Islam (18.3%), Sikhism (14.1%), Hinduism (11.8%), and those of no religion (11.3%).

Transport and locale

Buses

Yeading has the following bus routes travelling through it: 90, 120, 140, 282, 696, 697, E6, E9, X140, and N7, N140.

Library
Yeading Library, Yeading Lane, UB4 0EW.

Churches
 St Edmund of Canterbury, 12 Edmunds Close, UB4 0HA
 St Nicholas, 106 Raynton Drive, UB4 8BG
 St Raphael Catholic Church, Morrison Road, UB4 9JP
 Grange Park Baptists, 217 Lansbury Drive, UB4 8RS

Public houses
Pubs in Yeading include:
 The White Hart, White Hart Roundabout, UB5 5AX (closed 2003)
 The Walnut Tree, 115 Willow Tree Lane, UB4 9BL (closed 2018)
 The Industry, 171 Yeading Lane, UB4 0ES (now known as Aroma)

Sport and recreation
Football team Hayes & Yeading United F.C. was assembled from the former Hayes F.C. and Yeading F.C.

Yeading's parks and greens provide plenty of opportunity for children to play. There are three Local Nature Reserves, Yeading Brook Meadows, Ten Acre Wood and Gutteridge Wood and Meadows.

A community radio station, 91.8 Hayes FM, serves Yeading.

Notable people
 Greg Dyke, former Director-General of the BBC, attended Yeading Primary School

Yeading on screen
 Yeading F.C.'s erstwhile ground, known as the Warren, was used to film scenes from the Keira Knightley film Bend It Like Beckham (2002). Yeading's commercial manager Bill Perryman was given a part in the film.
 Yeading F.C.'s former ground was also used to film scenes from the Vinnie Jones film Mean Machine (2001).
 Location footage for British soap opera Family Affairs (1997-2005) was mostly shot in West London; the Lock and its surrounding areas were filmed at Willowtree Marina. In fact, the very first public transmission of Channel 5 was the first episode of Family Affairs, showing Willowtree Marina.

Nearest places

 Hayes
 Ealing
 Greenford
 Hanwell
 Northolt
 Southall
 Sudbury
 Harrow

References

External links
 Yeading Library
 Hayes FM community radio
 West London Shooting School
 T. F. T. Baker et al (eds.), A History of the County of Middlesex, vol. 4.

Areas of London
Districts of the London Borough of Hillingdon
Places formerly in Middlesex